Carry Me Home is a 2022 collaborative album between Americans roots rock drummer Levon Helm and soul singer Mavis Staples, released on Anti-. Made from sessions recorded at Helm's studio in 2011, shortly before his death, the album has received praise from critics.

Critical reception

 Editors at AnyDecentMusic? characterized critical consensus as a 7.5 out of 10, with eight reviews. The editors of AllMusic scored the album four out of five stars, with reviewer Mark Deming noting that "it's an excellent document of the simple, powerfully eloquent magic that happens when Mavis Staples steps before a vocal mike and lets her spirit elevate all around her". For Pitchfork, Grayson Haver Currin rated this release a 7.5 out of 10, summing it up as "a jubilant lesson in living history" with Helm's drumming, Staples' singing, and their dual backing bands noted as powerful ensembles, as well as the political and religious themes of the lyrics. In The Guardian, Alexis Petridis rated Cary Me Home four out of five stars, also pointing out Staples' "big, arresting, church-reared voice with a gritty undertow" that commands the performance. For American Songwriter, Lee Zimmerman rated the album a four out of five, writing that it "resonates in a meaningful and mighty way". For PopMatters, Steve Horowitz pointed out the recording's strong vocal performance by Staples and the varied accompaniment that allows her to take the lead on certain tracks; he rated it an eight out of 10.

Track listing
"This Is My Country" (Curtis Mayfield) – 4:34
"Trouble in My Mind" (Richard M. Jones) – 5:04
"Farther Along" (W. B. Stevens) – 4:22
"Hand Writing on the Wall" (Dottie Peoples, Harvey Lee Watkins, Jr.) – 4:06
"I Wish I Knew How It Would Feel to Be Free" (Dick Dallas, Bill Taylor) – 3:42
"Move Along Train" (Roebuck "Pops" Staples) – 3:27
"This May Be the Last Time" (Roebuck "Pops" Staples) – 4:38
"When I Go Away" (Larry Campbell) – 5:16
"Wide River to Cross" (Buddy Miller, Julie Miller) – 5:08
"You Got to Move" (Mississippi Fred McDowell) – 2:41
"You Got to Serve Somebody" (Bob Dylan) – 5:36
"The Weight" (Robbie Robertson) – 5:56

Personnel
Levon Helm Band
Steven Bernstein – trumpet
Larry Campbell – harmony vocals, guitar, mandolin, production
Jay Collins – tenor saxophone
Clark Gayton – trombone
Amy Helm – harmony vocals
Levon Helm – drums, vocals, executive production
Erik Lawrence – baritone saxophone
Brian Mitchell – piano, keyboards
Byron Isaacs – bass guitar
Teresa Williams – harmony vocals
Jim Weider – guitar

Mavis Staples Band
Donny Gerrard – harmony vocals
Stephen Hodges – drums
Rick Holmstrom – guitar
Vicki Randle – harmony vocals
Mavis Staples – vocals, executive production
Yvonne Staples – harmony vocals
Jeff Turmes – bass guitar

Technical personnel
Mark Chalecki – audio mastering at Little Red Book Mastering
Justin Guip – audio engineering
Brendan McDonough – assistant engineering
Landon Speers – photography

References

External links
Details on the recording from Staples' site

2022 live albums
Anti- (record label) albums
Collaborative albums
Levon Helm live albums
Mavis Staples live albums
Albums produced by Larry Campbell (musician)